Kasapreko Company Limited (KCL) is a Ghanaian ISO 22000:2005 certified indigenous manufacturer and producer of alcoholic and non-alcoholic drinks. Alomo Bitters a herbal based alcoholic drink is KCL's flagship product. Kasapreko was 6th according to the 2012 Ghana Club 100 rankings. In 2017 KCL was awarded top Ghanaian company in the competitive beverage sector by the Association of Ghana Industries.

History 
Kaspreko was started in 1989 by Dr Kwabena Adjei a Ghanaian businessman at Nungua in the Greater Accra Region of Ghana to provide quality and affordable drinks to Ghanaians.

Brands
KCL Key brands include:

Alcoholic 
 Alomo Bitters
 Kalahari Bitters
 Hand Sanitizer

Non-alcoholic 
 Storm Energy Drink
 Awake drinking water
 Royal Drinks
 10/10
 Veraldo
5 star multi fruit
Puma Drinks
Kiki Juice Drink

Antibiotics
In 2020 the company decided to go in to mass production of alcoholic hand sanitizers to fight against the novel coronavirus as result of shortage in the market.

Awards 
Kasapreko won the Outstanding Alcoholic Beverage Company of the Year at the 2019 West Africa Business Excellence Awards (WABEA). In 2020 the company was one of twelve businesses that  picked up honorary awards at the ninth Association of Ghana Industries (AGI) Ghana Industry and Quality Awards.

References 

Alcoholic drink companies
Manufacturing companies based in Accra
Drink companies of Ghana
Food and drink companies established in 1989
Ghanaian brands
Ghanaian companies established in 1989